Sun Hei Sports Club is a Hong Kong football club which currently competes in the Hong Kong Third Division. The club has a long history in playing in the top flight, but decided to self-relegate in the 2013–14 season after declining to participate in the newly established Hong Kong Premier League.

History
Sun Hei entered the Hong Kong First Division under the name Golden in the 1994–95 season. In 1996, Golden under the name Golden XI played against England. England was in Hong Kong preparing for the UEFA Euro 1996 later in the summer.  It was in Hong Kong that Paul Gascoigne's famous dentist chair incident took place.

After securing the sponsorship of Xiangxue Pharmaceutical, the club competed in the league under the team name Xiangxue Sun Hei from 2005–07.

In the season 2004–05, Sun Hei achieved The Quadruple, winning all four senior football competitions, including the Hong Kong First Division League, the Senior Shield, the League Cup and the FA Cup. In the 2005 AFC Cup, Sun Hei also got through to the semi-finals stage, the best result for a Hong Kong football club in the competition to date.

In season 2007–08, Sun Hei changed the club name to Convoy Sun Hei as the club obtained sponsorship from Convoy Financial Services, a Hong Kong financial service company.

In the 2009–10 and 2010–11 seasons, Sun Hei used Tsing Yi Sports Ground as their home ground.

In season 2011–12, the team changed its name to Sunray Cave JC Sun Hei due to sponsorship from Sunray Cave and JC Group, a company owned by Jackie Chan. The team used Mong Kok Stadium as its home ground for this season, but moved back to Tsing Yi Sports Ground for the 2013–14 season. As Sun Hei refused to take part in the NOW TV broadcast agreement, it did not have its home games shown live on Now TV, its personnel was not to be interviewed, it did not share any potential TV income and its sponsors' names were not be mentioned on Now TV broadcasts.

In the 2009–10 season, Sun Hei starts using Tsing Yi as their home ground. The first home match against a local strong team, Kitchee, has attracted around 1,200 fans. It is the highest percentage home attendance in this season.

In the 2013–14 season, Sun Hei decided to self-relegate at the end of the season after declining to participate in the newly established Hong Kong Premier League.

During the 2016–17 season, Sun Hei captured their first league title in over ten years winning the title by one point over Wong Tai Sin. However, they declined promotion to the Hong Kong Premier League at the end of the season due to financial difficulties.

A year after winning the First Division, Sun Hei were relegated following a 13th place finish in the 2017–18 season.

The club finished at the bottom of the table in the 2018–19 season and were relegated to the Hong Kong Third Division.

Team name history
The club has joined Hong Kong football league system by using the membership of Voicelink since 1994.
 1994–1999: Golden
 1999–2005: Sun Hei
 2005–2007: Xiangxue Sun Hei
 2007–2009: Convoy Sun Hei
 2009–2011: Sun Hei
 2011–2014: Sunray Cave JC Sun Hei
 2014–2017: Sun Hei
 2017–2018: Glorysky Sun Hei
 2018–    : Sun Hei

Continental record

Honours

League
 Hong Kong First Division
 Champions (4): 2001–02, 2003–04, 2004–05, 2016–17
 Runners-up (2): 2002–03, 2005–06

Cup Competitions
 Hong Kong Senior Shield
 Champions (2): 2004–05, 2011–12
 Runners-up (5): 1995–96, 2001–02, 2003–04, 2006–07, 2008–09
 Hong Kong FA Cup
 Champions (3): 2002–03, 2004–05, 2005–06
 Runners-up (2):: 1995–96, 2001–02
 Hong Kong League Cup
 Champions (4): 2002–03, 2003–04, 2004–05, 2008–09
 Runners-up (1): 2000–01
 Hong Kong FA Cup Junior Division
 Champions (2): 2015–16, 2016–17

References and notes

External links
 Sun Hei at HKFA

 
Association football clubs established in 1986
Football clubs in Hong Kong
Hong Kong Third Division League
1986 establishments in Hong Kong